The Shire is a region of J. R. R. Tolkien's fictional Middle-earth, described in The Lord of the Rings and other works. The Shire is an inland area settled exclusively by hobbits, the Shire-folk, largely sheltered from the goings-on in the rest of Middle-earth. It is in the northwest of the continent, in the region of Eriador and the Kingdom of Arnor.

The Shire is the scene of action at the beginning and end of Tolkien's The Hobbit, and of the sequel, The Lord of the Rings. Five of the protagonists in these stories have their homeland in the Shire: Bilbo Baggins (the title character of The Hobbit), and four members of the Fellowship of the Ring: Frodo Baggins, Sam Gamgee, Merry Brandybuck and Pippin Took. The main action in The Lord of the Rings returns to the Shire near the end of the book, in "The Scouring of the Shire", when the homebound hobbits find the area under the control of Saruman's ruffians, and set things to rights.

Tolkien based the Shire's landscapes, climate, flora, fauna, and placenames on rural England where he lived, first in Worcestershire as a boy, then in Oxfordshire. In Peter Jackson's films of both The Hobbit and The Lord of the Rings, the Shire was represented by countryside and constructed hobbit-holes on a farm near Matamata in New Zealand, which became a tourist destination.

Fictional description

Tolkien took considerable trouble over the exact details of the Shire. Little of his carefully crafted fictional geography, history, calendar, and constitution appeared in The Hobbit or The Lord of the Rings, though additional details were given in the Appendices of later editions. The Tolkien scholar Tom Shippey comments that all the same, they provided the "depth", the feeling in the reader's mind that this was a real and complex place, a quality that Tolkien believed essential to a successful fantasy.

Geography

Four farthings

In Tolkien's fiction, the Shire is described as a small but beautiful, idyllic and fruitful land, beloved by its  hobbit inhabitants. They had agriculture but were not industrialized. The landscape included downland and woods like the English countryside. The Shire was fully inland; most hobbits feared the Sea. The Shire measured 40 leagues (193 km, 120 miles) east to west and 50 leagues (241 km, 150 miles) from north to south, with an area of some : roughly that of the English Midlands.
The main and oldest part of the Shire was bordered to the east by the Brandywine River, on the north by uplands rising to the Hills of Evendim, on the west by the Far Downs, and on the south by marshland. It expanded to the east into Buckland between the Brandywine and the Old Forest, and (much later) to the west into the Westmarch between the Far Downs and the Tower Hills.

The Shire was subdivided into four Farthings ("fourth-ings", "quarterings"), as Iceland once was; similarly, Yorkshire was historically divided into three "ridings". The Three-Farthing Stone marked the approximate centre of the Shire. It was inspired by the Four Shire Stone near Moreton-in-Marsh, where once four counties met, but since 1931 only three do. There are several Three Shire Stones in England, such as in the Lake District, and formerly some Three Shires Oaks, such as at Whitwell in Derbyshire, each marking the place where three counties once met. Pippin was born in Whitwell in the Tookland.
Within the Farthings there are unofficial clan homelands: the Tooks nearly all live in or near Tuckborough in Tookland's Green Hill Country.

Buckland

Buckland, also known as the "East Marches", was just to the east of the Shire across the Brandywine River. Named for the Brandybuck family, it was settled "long ago" as "a sort of colony of the Shire." The Westmarch or West Marches was given to the Shire by King Elessar after the War of the Ring. It included Crickhollow, which serves as one of Frodo's five Homely Houses.

Bree

To the east of the Shire was the isolated village of Bree, unique in having hobbits and men living side-by-side. It was served by an inn named The Prancing Pony, noted for its fine beer which was sampled by hobbits, men, and the wizard Gandalf. Many inhabitants of Bree, including the inn's landlord Barliman Butterbur, had surnames taken from plants. Tolkien described the butterbur as "a fat thick plant", evidently chosen as appropriate for a fat man. Tolkien suggested two different origins for the people of Bree: either it had been founded and populated by men of the Edain who did not reach Beleriand in the First Age, remaining east of the mountains in Eriador; or they came from the same stock as the Dunlendings. 
The name Bree means "hill"; Tolkien justified the name by arranging the village and the surrounding Bree-land around a large hill, named Bree-hill. The name of the village Brill, in Buckinghamshire, a place that Tolkien often visited, inspired him to create Bree, has the same meaning: Brill is a modern contraction of Breʒ-hyll. Both syllables are words for "hill" – the first is Celtic and the second Old English.

History

The Shire was first settled by hobbits in the year 1601 of the Third Age (Year 1 in Shire Reckoning); they were led by the brothers Marcho and Blanco. The hobbits from the vale of Anduin had migrated west over the perilous Misty Mountains, living in the wilds of Eriador before moving to the Shire.

After the fall of Arnor, the Shire remained a self-governing realm; the Shire-folk chose a Thain to hold the king's powers. The first Thains were the heads of the Oldbuck clan. When the Oldbucks settled Buckland, the position of Thain was peacefully transferred to the Took clan. The Shire was covertly protected by Rangers of the North, who watched the borders and kept out intruders. Generally the only strangers entering the Shire were Dwarves travelling on the Great Road from their mines in the Blue Mountains, and occasional Elves on their way to the Grey Havens. In  the hobbits defeated an invasion of Orcs at the Battle of Greenfields. In –60, thousands of hobbits perished in the Long Winter and the famine that followed. In the Fell Winter of –12, white wolves from Forodwaith invaded the Shire across the frozen Brandywine river.

The protagonists of The Hobbit and Lord of the Rings, Bilbo and Frodo Baggins, lived at Bag End, a luxurious smial or hobbit-burrow, dug into The Hill on the north side of the town of Hobbiton in the Westfarthing. It was the most comfortable hobbit-dwelling in the town; there were smaller burrows further down The Hill. In  Bilbo Baggins left the Shire on the quest recounted in The Hobbit. He returned the following year, secretly bearing a magic ring. This turned out to be the One Ring. The Shire was invaded by four Ringwraiths in search of the Ring. While Frodo, Sam, Merry, and Pippin were away on the quest to destroy the Ring, the Shire was taken over by Saruman through his underling Lotho Sackville-Baggins. They ran the Shire in a parody of a modern state, complete with armed ruffians, destruction of trees and handsome old buildings, and ugly industrialisation.

The Shire was liberated with the help of Frodo and his companions on their return at the Battle of Bywater (the final battle of the War of the Ring). The trees of the Shire were restored with soil from Galadriel's garden in Lothlórien (a gift to Sam). The year  was considered by the inhabitants of the Shire to be the most productive and prosperous year in their history.

Language

The hobbits of the Shire spoke Middle-earth's Westron or Common Speech. Tolkien however rendered their language as modern English in The Hobbit and in Lord of the Rings, just as he had used Old Norse names for the Dwarves. To resolve this linguistic puzzle, he created the fiction that the languages of parts of Middle-earth were "translated" into different European languages, inventing the language of the Riders of Rohan, Rohirric, to be "translated" again as the Mercian dialect of Old English which he knew well. This set up a relationship something like ancestry between Rohan and the Shire.

Government

The Shire had little in the way of government. The Mayor of the Shire's capital, Michel Delving, was the chief official and was treated in practice as the Mayor of the Shire. There was a Message Service for post, and the 12 "Shirriffs" (three for each Farthing) of the Watch for police; their chief duties were rounding up stray livestock. These were supplemented by a varying number of "Bounders", an unofficial border force. At the time of The Lord of the Rings, there were many more Bounders than usual, one of the few signs for the hobbits of that troubled time. The heads of major families exerted authority over their own areas.

The Master of Buckland, hereditary head of the Brandybuck clan, ruled Buckland and had some authority over the Marish, just across the Brandywine River.

Similarly, the head of the Took clan, often called "The Took", ruled the ancestral Took dwelling of Great Smials, the village of Tuckborough, and the area of The Tookland. He held the largely ceremonial office of Thain of the Shire.

Calendar

Tolkien devised the "Shire calendar" or "Shire Reckoning" supposedly used by the Shire's hobbits on Bede's medieval calendar. In his fiction, it was created in Rhovanion hundreds of years before the Shire was founded. When hobbits migrated into Eriador, they took up the Kings' Reckoning, but maintained their old names of the months. In the "King's Reckoning", the year began on the winter solstice. After migrating further to the Shire, the hobbits created the "Shire Reckoning", in which Year 1 corresponded to the foundation of the Shire in the year 1601 of the Third Age by Marcho and Blanco. The Shire's calendar year has 12 months, each of 30 days. Five non-month days are added to create a 365-day year. The two Yuledays signify the turn of the year, so each year begins on 2 Yule. The Lithedays are the three non-month days at midsummer, 1 Lithe, Mid-year's Day, and 2 Lithe. In leap years (every fourth year except centennial years) an Overlithe day is added after Mid-year's Day. There are seven days in the Shire week. The first day of the week is  Sterday and the last is Highday. The Mid-year's Day and, when present, Overlithe have no weekday assignments. This causes every day to have the same weekday designation from year to year, instead of changing as in the Gregorian calendar.

For the names of the months, Tolkien reconstructed Anglo-Saxon names, his take on what the English would be if it had not adopted Latin names for the months such as January and February (also known as "Anglish"). In The Hobbit and The Lord of the Rings, the names of months and week-days are given in modern equivalents, so Afteryule is called "January" and Sterday is called "Saturday".

Inspiration

A calque upon England

Shippey writes that not only is the Shire reminiscent of England: Tolkien carefully constructed the Shire as an element-by-element calque upon England.

There are other connections; Tolkien equated the latitude of Hobbiton with that of Oxford (i.e., around 52° N). The Shire corresponds roughly to the West Midlands region of England in the remote past, extending to Worcestershire (where Tolkien grew up), forming in Shippey's words a "cultural unit with deep roots in history". The name of the Northamptonshire village of Farthinghoe triggered the idea of dividing the Shire into Farthings. Tolkien said that pipe-weed "flourishes only in warm sheltered places like Longbottom;" in the seventeenth century, the Evesham area of Worcestershire was well known for its tobacco.

Homely names

Tolkien made the Shire feel homely and English in a variety of ways, from names such as Bagshot Row and the Mill to country pubs with familiar names such as "The Green Dragon" in Bywater, "The Ivy Bush" near Hobbiton on the Bywater Road, and "The Golden Perch" in Stock, famous for its fine beer. Michael Stanton comments in the J.R.R. Tolkien Encyclopedia that the Shire is based partly on Tolkien's childhood at Sarehole, partly on English village life in general with, in Tolkien's words, "gardens, trees, and unmechanized farmland". The Shire's capital, Michel Delving, embodies a philological pun: the name sounds much like that of an English country town, but means "Much Digging" of hobbit-holes, from Old English micel, "great" and delfan, "to dig".

Childhood experience

The industrialization of the Shire was based on Tolkien's childhood experience of the blighting of the Worcestershire countryside by the spread of heavy industry as the city of Birmingham grew. "The Scouring of the Shire", involving a rebellion of the hobbits and the restoration of the pre-industrial Shire, can be read as containing an element of wish-fulfilment on his part, complete with Merry's magic horn to rouse the inhabitants to action.

Adaptations

Film

The Shire makes an appearance in both the 1977 The Hobbit and the 1978 The Lord of the Rings animated films.

In Peter Jackson's The Lord of the Rings motion picture trilogy, the Shire appeared in both The Fellowship of the Ring and The Return of the King. The Shire scenes were shot at a location near Matamata, New Zealand. Following the shooting, the area was returned to its natural state, but even without the set from the movie the area became a prime tourist location. Because of bad weather, 18 of 37 hobbit-holes could not immediately be bulldozed; before work could restart, they were attracting over 12,000 tourists per year to Ian Alexander's farm, where Hobbiton and Bag End had been situated.

Jackson's Bree is constantly unpleasant and threatening, complete with special effects and the Eye of Sauron when Frodo puts on the Ring. In Ralph Bakshi's animated 1978 adaptation of The Lord of the Rings, Alan Tilvern voiced Bakshi's Butterbur (as "Innkeeper"); David Weatherley played Butterbur in Jackson's epic, while James Grout played him in BBC Radio's 1981 serialization of The Lord of the Rings. In the 1991 low-budget Russian adaptation of The Fellowship of the Ring, Khraniteli, Butterbur appears as "Lavr Narkiss", played by Nikolay Burov. In Yle's 1993 television miniseries Hobitit, Butterbur ("Viljami Voivalvatti" in Finnish, meaning "William Butter") was played by Mikko Kivinen. Bree and Bree-land can be explored in the PC game The Lord of the Rings Online.

Jackson revisited the Shire for his films The Hobbit: An Unexpected Journey and The Hobbit: The Battle of the Five Armies. The Shire scenes were shot at the same location.

Games
In the 2006 real-time strategy game The Lord of the Rings: The Battle for Middle Earth II, the Shire appears as both a level in the evil campaign where the player invades in control of a goblin army, and as a map in the game's multiplayer skirmish mode.

In the 2007 MMORPG The Lord of the Rings Online, the Shire appears almost in its entirety as one of the major regions of the game. The Shire is inhabited by hundreds of non-player characters, and the player can get involved in hundreds of quests. The only portions of the original map by Christopher Tolkien that are missing from the game are some parts of the West Farthing and the majority of the South Farthing. A portion of the North Farthing also falls within the in-game region of Evendim for game play purposes.

In the 2009 action game The Lord of the Rings: Conquest, the Shire appears as one of the game's battlegrounds during the evil campaign, where it is razed by the forces of Mordor.

Games Workshop also produced a supplement in 2004 for The Lord of the Rings Strategy Battle Game entitled The Scouring of the Shire. This supplement contained rules for a large number of miniatures that depicted the Shire after the War of the Ring had concluded.

Notes

References

Primary
This list identifies each item's location in Tolkien's writings.

Secondary

Sources

 
 
 
 
   
   
   

 

de:Regionen und Orte in Tolkiens Welt#Auenland
lb:Länner a Stied aus Middle-earth#The Shire